Jagdschloss Kranichstein is a palace in Kranichstein, now part of Darmstadt, Hesse, Germany. It was built north of Darmstadt from 1578 as a Jagdschloss, a hunting lodge for George I, Landgrave of Hesse-Darmstadt. It served also as a summer residence. In 1917, it became a museum of hunting. From 1946, it was the first location of the Darmstädter Ferienkurse.

The estate is one of few remaining Baroque hunting lodges in Germany, referred to also as Kranichstein Hunting Lodge. It serves as a hunting museum, and as a hotel with restaurant and event location including for weddings.

History 
Jagdschloss Kranichstein was built on a commission from George I, Landgrave of Hesse-Darmstadt by his master builder  as a palace with three wings. Transformation of a former agricultural estate to a courtly palace began in 1578 and was completed in 1580. The estate was used for hunting by the landgraves for more than 350 years.

From 1863, Louis IV, the later Grand Duke of Hesse, and his wife Alice, a daughter of Queen Victoria, used the property temporarily as their residence, and in the following years as their summer residence. Queen Victoria visited the palace as a summer guest several times. 

The estate became a museum in 1917, when Ernest Louis collected all hunting weapons from his palaces and hunting lodges at this location.

It became the venue of the Darmstädter Ferienkurse, courses for contemporary music from 1946. In 1952, the Stiftung Hessischer Jägerhof foundation acquired the estate. In the same year, the museum was reopened, with a focus on the Baroque period. The palace was restored from 1988 to 1996 by the state, Darmstadt and the foundation, restoring the Renaissance version of the first floor. The estate has been used as a hotel, with a wedding venue from the end of the 20th century. In 2008, the museum bioversum in the Jagdzeughaus was opened. It deals with biodiversity and invasive species.

Literature 

 Peter Engels: 600 Jahre Kranichstein, in: Sechste Sommerspiele Jagdschloß Kranichstein, Darmstadt 1999
 Kuno Graf von Hardenberg: Das Jagdschloß Kranichstein und die Jagdmaler des Landgräflichen Hofes zu Darmstadt, Darmstadt 1918
 Eberhard Lohmann: Landgraf Georg I. und die Anfänge von Schloß Kranichstein, Darmstadt 2002
 Iris Reepen: Museum Jagdschloss Kranichstein, Deutscher Kunstverlag München/Berlin 2002 
 H. Retzlaff: Kranichstein. Renaissanceschloß und Jagdmuseum bei Darmstadt, Darmstadt 1961
 Gisela Siebert: Jagdhäuser der Landgrafen von Hessen-Darmstadt auf Bildern des 18. und 19. Jahrhunderts, Darmstadt 2001
 Wolfgang Weitz: Jagdwaffen aus dem Jagdmuseum Schloß Kranichstein, in: Museumsblätter Niddaer Heimatmuseum, Nidda 1990
 Bettina Clausmeyer-Ewers: Wildpark und Schlossgarten Kranichstein, Deutscher Kunstverlag (DKV), 2006

References

External links 

 
 
 
 Renaissanceschlösser in Hessen (project of Germanisches Nationalmuseum)
 
 Museum Jagdschloss Kranichstein theplacesihavebeen.com

Castles in Hesse
Museums in Darmstadt
Renaissance architecture in Germany
Baroque architecture in Hesse
Hotels in Germany
Buildings and structures completed in the 1570s